Parafreutreta vumbae is a species of tephritid or fruit flies in the genus Parafreutreta of the family Tephritidae.

Distribution
Zimbabwe.

References

Tephritinae
Insects described in 1986
Diptera of Africa